Cristian Agustín Fontana (born 11 June 1996) is an Argentine professional footballer who plays as a centre-forward for Defensa y Justicia on loan from River Plate.

Career

Banfield
Fontana started his career in the youth system of Banfield. He made his debut for the Primera División team on 25 October 2014 in a defeat away to Vélez Sarsfield, after replacing Santiago Salcedo with twenty-two minutes remaining. Two further appearances off the bench arrived in the subsequent 2015 and 2016 campaigns, before the forward made his first start on 10 September 2016 versus Colón. Fontana netted a brace during a 4–4 away draw against Tigre on 8 February 2019, before scoring again just over a week later at home to River Plate. He scored once in 2019–20, prior to netting five times at the 2020 Copa de la Liga Profesional.

On 8 February 2021, Fontana was sent to train with the reserves until his contract expiry date of 30 June 2021 due to contractual disagreements with Banfield; who claimed that he and his agent, Rubén Contini, had gone back on their word from many months prior to sign a contract extension, in turn asking for greater financial incentives. Fontana responded soon after, stating he had never officially agreed to extend his contract and that it was Banfield who ended negotiations.

River Plate
On 18 February 2021, having been out in the cold with Banfield, Fontana completed a transfer to River Plate for a fee worth $1,500,000.

To gain some experience, after only playing 440 minutes in 15 games for River plate, Fontana was loaned out to Defensa y Justicia in January 2022 for the rest of the year.

Career statistics
.

References

External links
 

1996 births
Living people
Argentine people of Italian descent
People from Lomas de Zamora
Argentine footballers
Association football forwards
Argentine Primera División players
Club Atlético Banfield footballers
Club Atlético River Plate footballers
Defensa y Justicia footballers
Sportspeople from Buenos Aires Province